Chirawat Pimpawatin (born 30 November 1952) is a Thai former footballer who competed in the 1968 Summer Olympics.

References

External links
 

1952 births
Living people
Chirawat Pimpawatin
Chirawat Pimpawatin
Footballers at the 1968 Summer Olympics
1972 AFC Asian Cup players
Association football defenders
Chirawat Pimpawatin